Aloi is a town in Uganda.

Aloi may also refer to:

 Aloi, Democratic Republic of the Congo, a village
 Aloi de Montbrai, a 14th-century sculptor in Catalonia
 Vincenzo Aloi (born 1933), New York mobster
 Benedetto Aloi (1935–2011), New York mobster
 Giovanni Aloi (born 1976), art historian and author